Most of songs sung by Cristina D'Avena are published in Fivelandia and Cristina D'Avena e i tuoi amici in TV compilation albums, which are released every year by RTI Music (previously named Five Record), the record label of Fininvest and Mediaset group, from 1983 to 2008. In these albums are often included songs sung by other singers, such as Enzo Draghi and Giorgio Vanni. The first album, which contains D'Avena's first songs (except "Il valzer del moscerino" and "È fuggito l'agnellino", her first songs presented at the Zecchino d'Oro), is Do re mi... five - Cantiamo con Five, released in 1982. Fivelandia series and Cristina D'Avena e i tuoi amici in TV series can be considered the main D'Avena's albums discography.

In addition, in D'Avena's discography, there are soundtrack albums of television series, which D'Avena plays the main character (Licia and Cristina series), cover albums, such as Cristina canta Disney, which contains covers of Disney songs and Magia di Natale, which contains covers of most popular Christmas songs, and remix albums, such as Cristina D'Avena Dance and Cartuno series. Also, are present several albums, which contains songs dedicated to television animated series aired by Fininvest and Mediaset (not to be confused soundtrack) and several compilation albums with her songs, which are not Fivelandia or Cristina D'Avena e i tuoi amici in TV.

In 2002, to celebrate her 20 years of musical career, D'Avena publishes the first compilation album promoted by her, Greatest Hits. Same thing happens in 2012, with the publishing of 30 e poi... Parte prima, compilation released to celebrate her 30 years of career. Next year, she publishes 30 e poi... Parte seconda.

In 2017, D'Avena changes her record label from RTI Music to Warner Music Italy and publishes Duets - Tutti cantano Cristina, followed by Duets Forever - Tutti cantano Cristina, which contains her most notable songs sung with other Italian artists.

Main albums

First album

Fivelandia series
Fivelandia compilation album series starts in 1983 and contains, along with Cristina D'Avena e i tuoi amici in TV series started in 1987, most of the songs sung by D'Avena. Albums of this series are released every year in autumn, until 2004. The series is composed by 22 albums, except reissues.

Reissues

Cristina D'Avena e i tuoi amici in TV series
The other important part of the D'Avena's songs is published in Cristina D'Avena e i tuoi amici in TV compilation album series (first album is named Cristina D'Avena con i tuoi amici in TV), which starts in 1987. Albums of this series are published every year in spring, until 2008. The series is composed by 21 albums, except reissues.

Reissues

Other compilations with unpublished songs

Reissues

Recent albums

Reissues

Animated series albums
In the Cristina D'Avena's discography are included several albums dedicated to some animated series aired by Fininvest and Mediaset. These albums are not the soundtracks of these animated series.

Reissues

Soundtracks albums
In the Cristina D'Avena's discography are included albums, which contains the soundtrack of television series, which D'Avena plays the main character. It also included the Italian-language soundtrack of Ai Shite Knight (Kiss Me Licia) anime.

Reissues

Cover albums

Reissues

Remix albums

Cartuno series
Cartuno is a series of albums, which contains Cristina D'Avena and Giorgio Vanni's remixed songs, published from 2001 to 2004. These albums are produced by Max Longhi and Giorgio Vanni.

Reissues

Compilation albums promoted by Cristina D'Avena

Reissues

Other compilation albums
In this list are excluded the albums already listed in "Other compilations with unpublished songs" section.

Reissues

Instrumental albums

Other albums

Albums where Cristina D'Avena is guest artist

See also
Cristina D'Avena singles discography
List of theme songs recorded by Cristina D'Avena
List of covers recorded by Cristina D'Avena
List of songs recorded by Cristina D'Avena

D'Avena, Cristina